Viktor Miklós (born 20 December 1993) is a Slovak footballer who currently plays for FK Rača.

Club career

ŠK Slovan Bratislava
Miklós made his Corgoň Liga's debut for ŠK Slovan Bratislava on 31 May 2014 entering in as a substitute in place of Lukáš Gašparovič against FC Spartak Trnava.

References

External links
 
 Futbalnet profile

1993 births
Living people
Slovak footballers
Association football midfielders
Expatriate footballers in Hungary
ŠK Slovan Bratislava players
FC DAC 1904 Dunajská Streda players
MFK Ružomberok players
Slovak Super Liga players
Ceglédi VSE footballers
FK Senica players
Footballers from Bratislava